Causton may refer to:

Edward Causton (1876–1957), English cricketer
Richard Causton (composer) (born 1971), English composer and teacher
Richard Causton, 1st Baron Southwark PC, DL (1843–1929), English stationer and Liberal politician
Causton, county town of the fictional Midsomer County in the Midsomer Murders novels and television series

See also
Caston